The 2013–14 season is Raith Rovers' fifth consecutive season in the second tier of Scottish football and the first in the newly established Scottish Championship, having been promoted from the Scottish Second Division at the end of the 2008–09 season. Raith Rovers will also compete in the Challenge Cup, League Cup and the Scottish Cup.

Summary

Management
Raith will be led by player-manager Grant Murray for the 2013–14 season as with the previous season.

Results & fixtures

Pre season

Scottish Championship

Scottish Challenge Cup

Scottish League Cup

Scottish Cup

Player statistics

Captain

Squad 
Last updated 3 May 2014

|}

Disciplinary record
Includes all competitive matches.

Last updated May 2014

Team statistics

League table

Division summary

References

Raith Rovers F.C. seasons
Raith Rovers